El Dorado High School is an AdvancED-accredited public charter high school located in Chandler, Arizona. A part of the Leona Group multi-state network of charter schools, El Dorado serves students in grades 9-12 and offers a curriculum aligned with Arizona state standards in a safe and student-centered small school environment.

References

Public high schools in Arizona
The Leona Group
Charter schools in Arizona
Schools in Maricopa County, Arizona
1998 establishments in Arizona
Educational institutions established in 1998